Curries (Rand Private Airfield) Aerodrome  is an aerodrome located adjacent to Curries, Ontario, Canada.

References

Registered aerodromes in Ontario
Transport in Oxford County, Ontario